The Open Angers Arena Loire is a WTA 125-level professional women's tennis tournament. It takes place on indoor hardcourts at Arena Loire Trélazé in the city of Angers in France. The prize money is $115,000. Nicolas Mahut is the tournament director.

Results

Singles

Doubles

References

External links
 Official website

Tennis tournaments in France
Hard court tennis tournaments
WTA 125 tournaments
Annual events in France
2021 establishments in France
Recurring sporting events established in 2021